Storeini, or flower weevils, is a tribe of true weevils (Curculionidae). The taxonomy of this poorly known group is in disarray, and there are many contradictory sources of information about it.

Genera 
Abantiadinus – Abethas – Aganeuma – Alloprocas – Anchonocranas – Aneuma – Aporotaxus – Arthriticosoma – Aubeonymus – Australafer – Cassythicola – Celetotelus – Cvdmaea – Cycloporopterus – Dicomada – Elleschodes – Emplesis – Erytenna – Euhackeria – Euprocas – Euthebus – Gerynassa – Glaucopela – Griphosternus – Hybomorphus – Hybophorus – Hypotagea – Imathia – Ixamine – Leucomelacis – Lexithia – Lybaeba – Melanterius – Merocarterus – Moechias – Neomelanterius – Neomycta – Notinus – Olanaea – Oropterus – Pachytychius – Palontus – Pansmicrus – Paryzeta – Peristoreus – Phorostichus – Placorrhinus – Praolepra – Pseudostoreus – Rhinidotasia – Simachus – Stilbopsis – Storeus – Terires – Teutheria

References 

 Alonso-Zarazaga, M. A.; Lyal, C. H. C. 1999: A world catalogue of families and genera of Curculionoidea (Insecta: Coleoptera) (excepting Scolytidae and Platypodidae). Entomopraxis, Barcelona. 
 Leschen, R. A. B.; Lawrence, J. F.; Kuschel, G.; Thorpe, S.; Wang, Q. 2003: Coleoptera genera of New Zealand. New Zealand entomologist, 26: 15–28. 

Curculioninae
Polyphaga tribes